Edmund William Barker  (1 December 1920 – 12 April 2001) was a Singaporean politician and lawyer who authored the Proclamation of Singapore. A member of the governing People's Action Party (PAP), he served in the Cabinet between 1964 and 1988. Barker also served as Speaker of the Legislative Assembly of Singapore between 1963 and 1964, and Leader of the House between 1968 and 1985.

Early life and education
Born in Singapore on 1 December 1920, he was a Eurasian Singaporean, Barker was the son of Clarence Barker and Dorothy Evaline Paterson.

Barker was of Portuguese, German, Indonesian, Japanese, Scottish and Irish descent and was third in a family of five children. His great-great-grandfather was Thomas Owen Crane (1799–1869), an Irishman and one of the first ten Europeans to settle in Singapore and his great-great-great-grandfather was Sir (Dr) Jose D Almeida (1784–1850), a Portuguese doctor and well-known businessman in early Singapore.

Barker was educated at Serangoon English School and Raffles Institution, before enrolling into Raffles College (now the National University of Singapore) in 1940. Barker was a top athlete in his school and university days. He represented Raffles College in cricket, soccer, rugby, athletics and hockey. A talented sports player, Barker was selected to represent Singapore as a member of the national hockey team while he was still a schoolboy. He is also known as a guitar player.

During the Second World War, Barker travelled to Thailand as part of a medical health unit which was sent to look after Allied POWs working on the Death Railway.

After the war, Barker was awarded a Queen's Scholarship in 1946 to study at the University of Cambridge in the United Kingdom, where he read law at St Catharine's College in 1948. He graduated with honours in 1951. He was then called to the bar at the Inner Temple in London, and returned to Singapore to practice law from 1952 to 1964.

Career
Barker practiced law in Singapore from 1956 to 1964 at the law firms Braddell Brothers and Lee & Lee. He was persuaded to enter politics in 1963 by Lee Kuan Yew. Barker was elected as a Member of the Legislative Assembly in 1963, representing Tanglin. He continued to represent Tanglin in the Parliament of Singapore until 1988, being re-elected six times by uncontested walkovers. He also held several ministerial positions during his period of service.

Barker served as Speaker of the Legislative Assembly from 1963 to 1964. In 1964, he was appointed as Minister for Law, and continued to hold that post until 1988. As Minister for Law, he drafted the Proclamation of Singapore in 1965, announcing Singapore's separation from Malaysia. 

During his 25 years in Parliament, Barker also served as Minister for National Development from 1965 to 1975, Minister for Home Affairs in 1972, Minister for the Environment from 1975 to 1979, Minister for Science and Technology from 1977 to 1981 and Minister for Labour in 1983.

Barker retired from politics in 1988 after 25 years of service. Other roles Barker held included being the first President of the Singapore National Olympic Council from 1970 to 1990, President of the South-East Asia Peninsular Games Federation Council in 1973, Chairman of the Bukit Turf Club from 1989 to 1994 and Chairman of the Singapore Exchange from 1989 to 1993.

Death
Barker died on 12 April 2001 at 12:40pm at the National University Hospital, after two months of intensive care following an emergency colon surgery in February 2001. He left behind his wife Gloria Hyacinth Quintal and four children.

The E W Barker Institute of Sports (EWBIS) at Raffles Institution is named after him. During his time at RI, he was a school captain, head prefect and champion athlete in 1938.

References

Lam, Peng Er & Tan, Kevin Y.L. (1999). Lee's Lieutenants. South Wind Production. .
"Old guard Stalwart Eddie Barker dies", The Straits Times, (2001, April 13), p1
"The reluctant politician", The Straits Times, Home, (2001, April 13), p2
"Breadwinner", (1970, May 8), The Straits Times, p6

External links
 Edmund Barker Singapore.zip

1920 births
2001 deaths
People's Action Party politicians
Queen's Scholars (British Malaya and Singapore)
Raffles Institution alumni
Singaporean people of German descent
Singaporean people of Irish descent
Singaporean politicians of Japanese descent
Singaporean people of Malay descent
Singaporean people of Portuguese descent
Singaporean people of Scottish descent
Speakers of the Parliament of Singapore
Members of the Dewan Rakyat
Members of the Legislative Assembly of Singapore
Burma Railway prisoners
Ministers for Law of Singapore
Environment ministers of Singapore
Ministers for Home Affairs of Singapore
Ministers for Labour of Singapore